Guru Nanak Public School is an English medium co-educational public school in Pitam Pura, Delhi. The school was founded as a nursery school in 1975 under the patronage of Sri Guru Singh Sabha, Punjabi Bagh, and by 1998 had expanded to an enrollment of 2300 at all levels up to higher secondary. Although the school follows a Sikh ethos many of the students are Hindu. It is affiliated to the Central Board of Secondary Education. 

The school aspires to "develop in [its] students a spiritual outlook on life by inculcating in them the love for mankind, service to humanity and worship of the Lord through Gurbani". Also the school has started online classes at the premises through various online modes set up by Indian or international education systems. In the time of pandemic the school is thriving in an attempt to provide quality education to their students.

See also
Education in India
Education in Delhi
List of schools in Delhi
 CBSE

References

External links

Schools in Delhi
North Delhi district
1975 establishments in Delhi